Dennis Diekmeier (born 20 October 1989) is a German professional footballer who plays as a right-back for SV Sandhausen in the 2. Bundesliga.

Coming through the ranks of Werder Bremen, Diekmeier moved to 1. FC Nürnberg in 2009. His form there led him to being named to one of the best full-backs in the league, after which he joined Hamburger SV in July 2010, where he enjoyed a successful eight-year spell. He left after the club suffered relegation in 2018. In January 2019, he signed with SV Sandhausen, helping them avoid relegation in his first season there.

Diekmeier has represented Germany at different youth levels, and was a part of the Germany under-19 team that won the 2008 European U-19 Championship.

Club career

Early career
Diekmeier started playing football at TSV Bierden and later played at TSV Verden before moving to the youth department of Werder Bremen in 2003. For the 2008–09 season, he was promoted to the second team of Werder Bremen, who competed in the 3. Liga. At the same time, Diekmeier was also included in the first-team squad. He was mostly employed as a midfielder during his time at Werder.

1. FC Nürnberg
In January 2009, Diekmeier moved to 2. Bundesliga side 1. FC Nürnberg, where he appeared in all matches during the second half of the season as well as in both relegation play-off games. kicker subsequently placed him as the third best full-back of spring season in their post-season awards. On the first matchday of the 2009–10 Bundesliga, Diekmeier was voted into the "Starting XI of the Day" for kicker-magazine. Eight rounds into the competition, Diekmeier was the only Nürnberg player who had played eight full games, alongside goalkeeper Raphael Schäfer. In the final training session before the ninth match-round, however, he suffered a severe allergic reaction and was treated after an emergency helicopter flew in. Nevertheless, it was decided that Diekmeier was fit to play. However, two hours before the start of the game he was suspended due to one of his medications being on the doping list. The allergic reaction was later diagnosed as allergic rhinitis caused by grass pollen. During the winter break, VfL Wolfsburg offered an estimated € 4 million for Diekmeier, which eventually did not amount to a transfer.

Hamburger SV
Instead, Diekmeier ended up signing with Hamburger SV in July 2010, whose home games he had attended as a child and whom he had supported since childhood. Because of an injury, he made his first appearance for HSV on 19 March 2011 in a 6–2 home win over 1. FC Köln. Head coach Michael Oenning had placed him in the starting lineup, before he was substituted for Guy Demel in the 55th minute. 

Diekmeier played for the club for eight years, during which he was mostly utilized as the main right-back under various coaches. In February 2018, however, negotiations to extend his contract reached a deadlock, and it was decided that he would leave the club at the expiration of his deal. Only at the end of the 2017–18 season, Diekmeier made another appearance under new coach Christian Titz. At that point, HSV were threatened by relegation, and he would not make another appearance in the final eight matches of the season. After HSV eventually suffered the first relegation for the Bundesliga in club history, Diekmeier left the club as his contract expired. He did not immediately earn himself a contract at another club, instead keeping himself in shape with the aid of personal coach.

SV Sandhausen
In early January 2019, after being a free agent for six months, Diekmeier joined relegation threatened 2. Bundesliga club SV Sandhausen, where he signed a one-and-a-half year contract. He made 16 league appearances during the second half of the 2018–19 season in which the club avoided relegation. Prior to the 2019–20 season, Diekmeier signed a contract extension keeping him in Sandhausen until 2022, and was also appointed vice-captain by head coach Uwe Koschinat. After regular club captain Stefan Kulovits suffered an injury which kept him sidelined for the entire first half of the season, Diekmeier played 17 matches as captain for Sandhausen. 

On 26 May 2020, Diekmeier finally scored his first ever professional goal at the age of 30 in Sandhausen's 1–0 away win over SV Wehen Wiesbaden, a feat which the club celebrated by offering free printing of his name and number on their replica kits. This goal proved momentous in marking the first of four consecutive victories for Sandhausen towards the end of the 2019–20 season, the points from which they secured to stay in the 2. Bundesliga for another season with two games to spare, despite a 5–1 away defeat to VfB Stuttgart on the 32nd matchday. On matchday 34, Diekmeier scored a goal capping off a 1–5 drubbing of Hamburger SV, his former club. On 11 July 2020, Diekmeier capped off a strong 2019–20 campaign by being named in the kicker "Team of the Season" for the 2. Bundesliga.

International career
He was part of the Germany team that won the 2008 European U-19 Championship.

Trivia
Diekmeier held the record of being the Bundesliga player with the most appearances without ever scoring until finally scoring on 26 May 2020 in his 11th season in German professional football.

Career statistics

1.Includes promotion/relegation playoff.

References

External links
 
 
 kicker profile 
 

1989 births
Living people
People from Verden (district)
Association football defenders
German footballers
Footballers from Lower Saxony
Germany youth international footballers
SV Werder Bremen II players
1. FC Nürnberg players
Hamburger SV players
Hamburger SV II players
SV Sandhausen players
Bundesliga players
2. Bundesliga players
3. Liga players